Kankrola is a large Yadav village in the Gurgaon District of the Indian state of Haryana. The village has a population of about 3,357 persons made up of around 595 households.

Nearby villages include Bhangrola, Naharpur Kasan, Manesar, Sikandar Pur Badha, Badha, Dhorka and Kasan.

References 

Villages in Gurgaon district